Z-FA-FMK, abbreviating for benzyloxycarbonyl-phenylalanyl-alanyl-fluoromethyl ketone, is a very potent irreversible inhibitor of cysteine proteases, including cathepsins B, L, and S, cruzain, and papain.  It also selectively inhibits effector caspases 2, 3, 6, and 7 but not caspases 8 and 10. This compound has been shown to block the production of IL1-α, IL1-β, and TNF-α induced by LPS in macrophages by inhibiting NF-κB pathways.

References

Protease inhibitors
Carbamates
Organofluorides